Muhsindzhon Abdugaffor (born 9 April 1997) is a Tajikistani professional football player who currently plays for CSKA Pamir Dushanbe.

Career

International
Abdugaffor made his senior team debut on 2 October 2018 against Nepal.

Career statistics

International

Statistics accurate as of match played 16 December 2018

References

External links
 

1997 births
Living people
Tajikistani footballers
Tajikistan international footballers
Association football midfielders